Byala Municipality is a municipality (obshtina) in Varna Province, located in the central part of the Bulgarian Black Sea Coast. It is named after its administrative centre - the town of Byala.

Not to be confused with the municipality of the same name in Ruse Province.

Settlements 

Byala Municipality includes the following 6 places (towns are shown in bold):

Demography 
The following table shows the change of the population during the last four decades.

Religion 
According to the latest Bulgarian census of 2011, the religious composition, among those who answered the optional question on religious identification, was the following:

An overwhelming majority of the population of Byala Municipality identify themselves as Christians. At the 2011 census, 75.3% of respondents identified as Orthodox Christians belonging to the Bulgarian Orthodox Church.

See also
Provinces of Bulgaria
Municipalities of Bulgaria
List of cities and towns in Bulgaria

References

External links
 Official website 

Municipalities in Varna Province